Community Christian Church (CCC) is a Christian multi-site megachurch, with headquarters in Naperville, Illinois. As of December 2016, the church conducts services at 8 different locations in Chicago area, in both the city and the suburbs.

The church was founded in 1989 by brothers Dave and Jon Ferguson and four of their friends; as they put it, they wanted to build a church that would "help people find their way back to God." Dave Ferguson is senior pastor.

References

External links

Churches in Illinois
Evangelical megachurches in the United States
Culture of Naperville, Illinois
Companies based in Naperville, Illinois
Non-denominational Evangelical multisite churches
Megachurches in Illinois